"Blue (Da Ba Dee)" is a song by Italian music group Eiffel 65. It was first released in October 1998 in Italy by Skooby Records and became internationally successful the following year. It is the lead single of their 1999 debut album, Europop. The song is the group's most popular single, reaching number one in at least 18 countries, charting at number three in Italy, and peaking at number six on the US Billboard Hot 100 in January 2000.

In the United Kingdom, the song initially entered the top 40 purely on import sales; it was only the third single to do this. The song also received a Grammy Award nomination for Best Dance Recording at the 2001 Grammy Awards.

Writing and production
Written by Eiffel 65 lead singer Jeffrey Jey, keyboardist Maurizio Lobina, and producer Massimo Gabutti, "Blue (Da Ba Dee)" was inspired by Lobina's composed opening piano hook. The producers of the song then came up with the idea for a dance song. Jey explained that his inspiration for the lyrics was how a person chooses their lifestyle. The colour blue as the main theme of the song was picked at random, with Lobina telling him to write nonsensical lyrics. Gabutti came up with the "da ba dee" hook. The pitch-shifted vocal effect used in the song was created with a harmonizer.

Lyrics and composition

"Blue (Da Ba Dee)" is written in the key of G minor, with the vocal range spanning from C3 to E4, and is set in common time with a moderate tempo of 128 beats per minute.

The song's lyrics tell a story about a man who lives in a "blue world." It also explains that he is "blue inside and outside," which, alongside the lyric "himself and everybody around 'cause he ain't got nobody to listen," and "blue are the feelings that live inside me" may indicate that the term blue represents his emotional state; however, the song also explains that a vast variety of what he owns is also blue, including his house and his car ("a blue Corvette"): different blue-coloured objects are also depicted on the single's cover.

Critical reception
The song received mixed reviews from critics. Chuck Taylor from Billboard wrote that "the hook here, with its dancy but curiously compelling singsongy rhythm and lyric, is destined to react instantly with listeners far and wide." He also noted that it has a "euro sound", and "it's creative, it will affect listeners on both ends of the demographic spectrum, and it's anthemic." A reviewer from Entertainment Weekly positively reviewed the song, calling the song "a fleeting, feel-good foot-tapper" and gave the song a rating of B−. Scottish newspaper Daily Record said it is the "strangest-sounding Euro-club hit of the summer". The Daily Vault's Christopher Thelen described it as a "quirky little hit" with a "bouncy chorus". He also noted that "the key is the use of the voice synthesizer". PopMatters reviewer Chris Massey, in his review of Europop, described his initial reaction to the song as being "really, really bad." However, he later stated in the review that after many repeated listenings of the song he "loved it." AllMusic editor Jose F. Promis described the song as a "hypnotic smash" in his review of Europop.

Rolling Stone, however, in their review of Europop, gave the song a negative review, commenting that the song "blends Cher-esque vocoder vocals, trance-like synth riffs, unabashed Eurodisco beats and a baby-babble chorus so infantile it makes the Teletubbies sound like Shakespeare." The magazine also placed the song on their list of the "20 Most Annoying Songs," at No. 14.

Chart performance
The single, released in October 1998, was a chart-topper in many European countries. The song initially found success in France, where it debuted in August 1999 and reached number one for three weeks. It then found success in other European countries, reaching the top spot on many charts in September the same year, including Germany, the Netherlands, Switzerland, Sweden, The song re-charted on 6 May 2013 at No. 40 in the UK, following its inclusion in Iron Man 3.

Music video

The accompanying music video for the song was released in 1999 by BlissCoMedia, a computer graphics division of Bliss Corporation, known at the time the video was produced and released as BlissMultiMedia.

Like much of the Bliss Corporation's music videos, this one was done in a green screen garage studio at BlissCoMedia, and it featured computer-generated graphics that were done in 3ds Max. With very few resources, tutorials and books, and only one editing machine, the video was made between 1998 and 1999 in a garage in about two to three months, much like other videos made by BlissCo.

Former BlissCo employee Davide La Sala has talked about coming up with the story for the video: "We had brainstorming sessions and we were a very imaginative team, huge fans of sci-fi movies and video games: Blade Runner, Star Wars, etc… we were master in doing our best and working with the few tools we had to create complete short stories in a very short period of time."

Similar to other music videos by BlissCo, a total of five people worked on this video. The green-screen footage was done in a short amount of time, and some of it was put into a computer-generated 3D environment, while components of the band were also shot. La Sala said, "We were very flexible but every person in the team had his own special skill who was more towards motion graphics, design and editing, others more skilled in architectural design and me and the CEO experts in animation."

The video was listed in NME's "50 Worst Music Videos Ever".

Synopsis
The video takes place on Tukon4, where lead singer Jeffrey Jey is abducted by blue-coloured aliens Zorotl and Sayok6 during a concert.

Notable cover versions and parodies
 Wynter Gordon sang the chorus of "Blue (Da Ba Dee)" in Flo Rida's 2009 single "Sugar".
 Dance music act Michael Mind Project used a sample of "Blue (Da Ba Dee)" in their 2012 single "Feeling So Blue". The single featuring Dante Thomas charted in Germany, Austria, Switzerland and France.
 In 2017, a remix of the song by David Guetta featuring vocals from Bebe Rexha, with completely different lyrics, was played at Ultra Music Festival 2017 but was not released. In 2022, the track became popular on TikTok. This resurgence in popularity led Guetta and Rexha to finish the song, and it was released in August 2022 with the title "I'm Good (Blue)".
 In 2019, Swedish singer Nea interpolated the song in "Some Say".
 In 2020, Italian rapper Shiva sampled the song in his single "Auto blu".
 In December 2020, Symphonic death metal Band Fleshgod Apocalypse released a cover of "Blue (Da Ba Dee)" in their own style. 
In celebration of the 25th anniversary of the Blue's Clues franchise, a small parody video about this song was produced and performed by Steve Burns, Donovan Patton, and Joshua Dela Cruz.
In July 2022, Softest Hard and T-Pain released a remix of the song.

Formats and track listings

 CD single (Italy)
 "Blue (Da Ba Dee)" (DJ Ponte Ice Pop Mix) – 6:25
 "Blue (Da Ba Dee)" (DJ Ponte Radio Edit) – 4:43
 "Blue (Da Ba Dee)" (Glamour Jump Cut) – 5:19
 "Blue (Da Ba Dee)" (Dub Mix) – 4:47

 CD single 1 (UK) "Blue (Da Ba Dee)" (Original Ice Pop Radio Edit) – 4:46
 "Blue (Da Ba Dee)" (Hannover Remix Radio Edit) – 4:04
 "Blue (Da Ba Dee)" (Glamour Jump Cut) – 5:19
 "Blue (Da Ba Dee)" (Dub) – 4:48

 CD single 2 (UK) "Blue (Da Ba Dee)" (Original Ice Pop 12" Mix) – 6:30
 "Blue (Da Ba Dee)" (Hannover 12" Remix) – 6:25
 "Blue (Da Ba Dee)" (Paris Remix) – 7:03
 "Blue (Da Ba Dee)" (Video) – 3:40

 Digital single'''
 "Blue (Da Ba Dee)" (Gabry Ponte Ice Pop Mix) – 6:27
 "Blue (Da Ba Dee)" (Gabry Ponte Ice Pop Radio) – 4:44
 "Blue (Da Ba Dee)" (Gabry Ponte Video Edit) – 3:40
 "Blue (Da Ba Dee)" (Dub Mix) – 4:47
 "Blue (Da Ba Dee)" (Molinaro Parade Mix) – 8:50
 "Blue (Da Ba Dee)" (Glamour Jump Cut) – 5:17
 "Blue (Da Ba Dee)" (Max 04 Ext Remix) – 6:35
 "Blue (Da Ba Dee)" (Hannover Remix) – 6:23
 "Blue (Da Ba Dee)" (Paris Remix) – 7:43

Charts

Weekly charts

Year-end charts

Decade-end charts

Certifications

Release history

References

1998 songs
1998 debut singles
1999 singles
Eiffel 65 songs
Songs written by Maurizio Lobina
Dutch Top 40 number-one singles
European Hot 100 Singles number-one singles
Irish Singles Chart number-one singles
Number-one singles in Australia
Number-one singles in Austria
Number-one singles in Denmark
Number-one singles in Finland
Number-one singles in Germany
Number-one singles in Hungary
Number-one singles in New Zealand
Number-one singles in Norway
Number-one singles in Scotland
Number-one singles in Sweden
Number-one singles in Switzerland
RPM Top Singles number-one singles
SNEP Top Singles number-one singles
UK Singles Chart number-one singles
Ultratop 50 Singles (Flanders) number-one singles
Animated music videos
Blanco y Negro Records singles
Logic Records singles
Republic Records singles
Songs about loneliness